Dilhara Salgado (born 25 March 1983) is a Sri Lankan archer. She attended Methodist College, Colombo and is a member of the Sri Lanka Air Force Archery Club. She competed in the 2011 World Archery Championships in Turin, Italy, scoring 1289.

Salgado has also participated in the 2006 Asian Games and in the 2010 Asian Games. She competed at the Olympic qualification tournament in the United States in an attempt to reach the 2012 Summer Olympics.

In the 2016 South Asian Games, she was part of the Sri Lankan women's archery team which won the silver medal in the Archery event.

References

External links 
Profile at World Archery

Profile at 304

1983 births
Living people
Sri Lankan female archers
Archers at the 2006 Asian Games
Archers at the 2010 Asian Games
Archers at the 2010 Commonwealth Games
Asian Games competitors for Sri Lanka
Commonwealth Games competitors for Sri Lanka
South Asian Games silver medalists for Sri Lanka
South Asian Games medalists in archery
20th-century Sri Lankan women
21st-century Sri Lankan women